Ali G, Innit is a VHS release (later re-issued on DVD) of Ali G interview segments from The 11 O'Clock Show as well as footage not broadcast.  It is hosted by Ali G himself.

Contents
Welcome
The Law
Wales
Education
The Countryside
The Military
Religion
Northern Ireland
Women
Joining Europe
Art
Culture
Censorship
Class
The Alternative Health Service
Science
Royalty
Fashion
Socialism
The Environment

References

External links
 

Television videos and DVDs
British comedy films
1999 comedy films
1999 films
Films with screenplays by Sacha Baron Cohen
1990s English-language films
1990s British films